The ULM Soccer Complex was built in 2006. The complex features covered bench areas for both teams and a press box, with seating for 500 spectators and standing room for many more. ULM soccer field was the first home of ULM women's soccer and it saw its first action on Aug. 27, 2006, as ULM played McNeese State University, but lost 0–2. The Warhawks has compiled an 18-37 overall record on ULM Soccer Complex field.

The soccer field received a new scoreboard in 2011, upon the other renovations. The scoreboard an led scoreboard with both teams names and period-time.

See also
List of soccer stadiums in the United States

References

External links
 ULM Soccer Complex

Louisiana–Monroe Warhawks women's soccer
College soccer venues in the United States
Soccer venues in Louisiana
Sports venues in Monroe, Louisiana
Sports venues completed in 2006
2006 establishments in Louisiana